SIFOREX, Silent Force Exercise, is an advanced anti-submarine warfare (ASW) bilateral exercise hosted and administered by the Peruvian Navy with participation of the United States Navy. Its main purpose is to provide an advanced anti-submarine training against diesel-electric powered submarines.
The event is held annually in July in Callao, Peru under the leadership of the Submarine Command of the Peruvian Navy, headquartered at the Base Naval del Callao (Callao Naval Base).

External links
Globalsecurity.org, SIFOREX, accessed August 2011

Anti-submarine warfare
Military exercises and wargames
Peruvian Navy
Military exercises involving the United States